Maureen Hatcher Conte is biogeochemist known for her work using particles to define the long-term cycling of chemical compounds in seawater.

Education and career 
Conte has a B.A. from Johns Hopkins University (1975), and an M.A. (1982), M.Phil. (1987), and Ph.D. (1989) from Columbia University. Her Ph.D. examined lipids found in particles in the Gulf Stream. Following her Ph.D. she conducted postdoctoral work at the University of Bristol before joining Woods Hole Oceanographic Institution in 1994. As of 2022 Conte is a senior scientist at the Bermuda Institute of Ocean Sciences and a fellow at the Marine Biological Laboratory. Conte is the lead investigator for the Ocean Flux Program, a program that has been examining particles in the Sargasso Sea since 1978.

Research 
Conte is known for her work on the organic compounds found in particles. Her early work examined the consumption of organic matter, and the development of methods to analyze lipids from seawater. Subsequently, she examined the different types of lipids found in organisms such as coccolithophores. At the Bermuda Atlantic Time-series Study site, Conte has used long-term measurements of particles to quantify changes in the flux of organic carbon to the seafloor over time, and used the presence of alkenones in particles to track changes in ocean temperatures over time. Through her research she has characterized how hurricanes impact the flow of organic carbon to the seafloor, and examined the impact of cold shock on sea turtles that are trapped in cold waters off Cape Cod. Conte's research involves spending extended periods of time on research ships, and in 2020, her research was delayed because she could not collect her samples due to the COVID-19 pandemic.

Selected publications

References

External links 

 Ocean Flux Program

Living people
Women climatologists
Johns Hopkins University alumni
Columbia University alumni
Women oceanographers
Women chemists
Year of birth missing (living people)